The Fono Aoao Faitulafono (Legislative Assembly) of Samoa has 51 members representing 51 electoral constituencies. Until 1991 voting for candidates in traditional territorial constituencies was by matai (chiefs) suffrage only. After a 1990 plebiscite, universal suffrage was introduced with a voting age of 21.

Only registered matais may stand in territorial electorates.

Previously

Up until the 2021 Election, there were 49 members. Of these, 47 were elected from 41 territorial constituencies based on traditional districts. Two members were elected on a non-territorial basis by voters on the Individual Voters Roll. Voters and candidates could move from the territorial constituencies rolls to the Individual Voters Roll. The eligibility of candidates and voters for the two types of constituencies was different.

Changes were implemented in 2019 with an amendment to the Samoan Constitution, and the Electoral Constituencies Act.

Territorial constituencies

The constituencies each belong to an itūmālō (political district) and are given an official number:

References

External links 
General Information - The Parliament of Samoa
Territorial Constituencies Act 1963 - Pacific Legal Information Institute

Politics of Samoa
Constituencies by country